The Nallian Nature Reserve is located approximately fifteen kilometres north east of Wagin, Western Australia.

It is home to a range of local animals and plants such as kangaroos and native grasses and also introduced species such as foxes and rabbits.

It is accessed off a track running north from Nallian Road.

External links
 Aerial Snapshot of reserve

Nature reserves in Western Australia